Alen Kurt (born 3 August 1974) is a Bosnian retired football player. He is currently a youth coach at Olimpik.

Club career
He played the majority of his career for Željezničar Sarajevo and was part of the team that won the first 2000–01 Premier League of Bosnia and Herzegovina title.

International career
Kurt made one appearance for Bosnia and Herzegovina, coming on as a second-half substitute for Ramiz Husić in an August 1999 friendly match against Liechtenstein.

References

External links

Profile - NFSBIH

1974 births
Living people
Footballers from Sarajevo
Association football defenders
Bosnia and Herzegovina footballers
Bosnia and Herzegovina international footballers
FK Željezničar Sarajevo players
FK Olimpik players
NK Žepče players
Premier League of Bosnia and Herzegovina players
First League of the Federation of Bosnia and Herzegovina players
Bosnia and Herzegovina football managers